Andrea Giovi (born 19 August 1983) is an Italian volleyball player, a member of Italy men's national volleyball team and Italian club Sir Safety Perugia, a bronze medalist of the Olympic Games London 2012, World League (2013, 2014) and silver medalist of the European Championship (2011, 2013).

References

External links

 Andrea Giovi at the International Volleyball Federation
 
 Andrea Giovi at Lega Pallavolo Serie A 
 
 
 

1983 births
Living people
Sportspeople from Perugia
Italian men's volleyball players
Volleyball players at the 2012 Summer Olympics
Medalists at the 2012 Summer Olympics
Olympic medalists in volleyball
Olympic volleyball players of Italy
Olympic bronze medalists for Italy
Mediterranean Games medalists in volleyball
Mediterranean Games gold medalists for Italy
Competitors at the 2009 Mediterranean Games